The Buramsan Tunnel (불암산터널) is a road tunnel started at Byeollae-dong, Namyangju, Gyeonggi Province, South Korea and ended at Sanggye-dong, Nowon-gu, Seoul. The tunnel constitutes the Seoul Ring Expressway.

The Suraksan Tunnel lies nearby to the north-westwards of the Bulamsan Tunnel.

See also 
 Gwangam Tunnel: Pangyo direction, next tunnel
 Suraksan Tunnel: Guri direction, next tunnel

Road tunnels in South Korea
Buildings and structures in Seoul
Buildings and structures in Namyangju
Transport in Gyeonggi Province
Namyangju
Tunnels completed in 2006
2006 establishments in South Korea